Masjid Abdul Hamid Kampong Pasiran, or Abdul Hamid Kampong Pasiran Mosque (Jawi: مسجد عبدالحميد كامڤوڠ ڤاسيرن) is a mosque in Novena, Singapore. Built in 1932 in an area then known as Kampong Pasiran to replace a surau, it serves the needs of office workers around Newton and Novena. Before April 2002, it had a capacity of about 300 people. The mosque was demolished, rebuilt, and reopened on 24 October 2022. The new mosque building, built at a cost of $2 million, has a capacity of 600 people.

Transportation
The mosque is accessible from Novena MRT station.

See also
Islam in Singapore
List of mosques in Singapore
Majlis Ugama Islam Singapura

References

External links 

1932 establishments in Singapore
Abdul Hamid
Mosques completed in 1932
Novena, Singapore
20th-century architecture in Singapore